2012–13 Albanian Cup was the sixty-first season of Albania's annual cup competition. Laçi, the winners of the competition qualified for the first qualifying round of the 2013–14 UEFA Europa League. KF Tirana were the defending champions, but were eliminated by Kukësi in the second round.

Apart from the Quarter-finals, the ties are played in a two-legged format similar to those of European competitions. If the aggregate score is tied after both games, the team with the higher number of away goals advances. If the number of away goals is equal in both games, the match is decided by extra time and a penalty shoot-out, if necessary.

Preliminary Tournament
In order to reduce the number of participating teams for the First Round to 32, a preliminary tournament is played. Only teams from the Second Division (third level) are allowed to enter. In contrast to the main tournament, the preliminary tournament is held as a single-leg knock-out competition.

First Preliminary Round
These matches took place on 12 September 2012.

Second Preliminary Round
These matches took place on 19 September 2012.

First round
All 30 teams of the 2012–13 Superliga and First Division entered in this round along with the two qualifiers from the Second Preliminary Round. The first legs were played on 26 September 2012 and the second legs took place on 3 October 2012.

Second round
All 16 qualified teams from First Round progressed to the Second Round. The first legs were played on 24 October 2012 and the second legs took place on 7 November 2012.

Quarter-finals
The 8 winners from the Second Round were placed in 2 groups of 4 teams each. Each group played a double round robin schedule for a total of 6 games for each team. The top 2 teams in each group advanced to the next round of the competition. These matches took place between 4 December 2012 and 5 March 2013.

Group A

Group B

Semi-finals
The four winners from the quarter finals competed in this round. The matches took place on 3 and 17 April 2013.

Laçi advanced to the final.

Bylis advanced to the final.

Final

References

External links
 Official website 
 Albanian Cup at soccerway.com

Cup
2012–13 domestic association football cups
2012-13